This is a list of chief justices of the Bombay High Court. See List of Chief Justices of the Supreme Court of Bombay for previous chief justices.

List of Chief Justices

References

Bombay High Court